War Paint is a 1926 American silent Western film directed by W. S. Van Dyke. The film stars Tim McCoy. Louis B. Mayer observed the profits made by other studios with western franchises such as Tom Mix, Buck Jones or Hoot Gibson. He selected a genuine army officer who had lived with Indian tribes to come to Hollywood as an advisor on 1922's The Covered Wagon: Colonel Timothy John Fitzgerald McCoy. His debut as Tim McCoy in War Paint was announced under the banner "He's the real McCoy!" In order to maximize the economics, the film was shot simultaneously on location with another film, Winners of the Wilderness. The film is considered lost. A trailer however is preserved at the Library of Congress.

Synopsis
An Indian chief of the Arapahoe escapes the reservation where he has been living and takes along some of his warriors. The cavalry is sent out for them.

Cast
 Tim McCoy as Lt. Tim Marshall 
 Pauline Starke as Polly Hopkins 
 Charles K. French as Maj. Hopkins (as Charles French) 
 Chief Yowlachie as Iron Eyes 
 Whitehorse as White Hawk (as Chief Whitehorse) 
 Karl Dane as Petersen

References

External links
 
 

1926 films
Lost Western (genre) films
Metro-Goldwyn-Mayer films
American black-and-white films
Films directed by W. S. Van Dyke
1926 Western (genre) films
Lost American films
1926 lost films
Silent American Western (genre) films
1920s American films